The turbine hall, generating hall or turbine building is a building or room in any steam cycle or hydroelectric power plant which houses a number of components vital to the generation of electricity from the steam that comes from the boiler, or from the water coming from the reservoir.  The components in the turbine hall typically are the turbines and electric generators, and in the case of steam cycle plants, moisture separators and reheaters. A turbine hall is typically extremely loud, and in the case of steam cycle plants, hot.

In nuclear power plants, boiling water reactors present unique challenges since the steam going through the turbines may be radioactive.  This means that the turbine hall has to be slightly contained and much unique maintenance must be performed. A typical plant will house one high-pressure turbine and two low-pressure turbines.

See also

Boiler
Turbine

External links
Nuclear tourist - turbine halls

Turbines
Nuclear power plant components